Viktar Zaitsau (born 27 August 1992) is a Belarusian handball player for GK Permskie Medvedi and the Belarusian national team.

References

1992 births
Living people
Belarusian male handball players
People from Babruysk
Expatriate handball players
Belarusian expatriate sportspeople in Russia
Sportspeople from Mogilev Region